Odd Olsen can refer to:
Odd Olsen, Norwegian investigator of British European Airways Flight 530 in 1946
Odd Rikard Olsen (1947–2012), Norwegian newspaper editor and politician
Odd Olsen Ingerø (born 1950), Norwegian politician
Odd Inge Olsen (born 1969), Norwegian footballer